Princess Elisabeth Pauline Alexandrine of Saxe-Altenburg (26 March 1826 – 2 February 1896) was a daughter of Joseph, Duke of Saxe-Altenburg and his wife Duchess Amelia of Württemberg. By marriage, she became Grand Duchess of Oldenburg.

Family and early life

Elisabeth was born on 26 March 1826 in Hildburghausen. She was the fourth daughter born to Joseph, the then Hereditary Prince of Saxe-Hildburghausen and his wife Duchess Amelia of Württemberg. Her official title was Princess Elisabeth of Saxe-Hildburghausen until later that year, when her family moved to Altenburg as a result of a transfer of territories among the various branches of the Ernestine Wettins. Elisabeth then took the title Princess Elisabeth of Saxe-Altenburg. In 1834, her father succeeded as Duke of Saxe-Altenburg, but was forced to abdicate in the civil revolution of 1848 due to the conservative, anti-reform nature of his government.

Elisabeth and her siblings were educated by Carl Ludwig Nietzsche, a Lutheran pastor and the father of the famous philosopher Friedrich Nietzsche. Her sisters included Queen Marie of Hanover (wife of George V of Hanover) and Grand Duchess Alexandra Iosifovna of Russia (wife of Grand Duke Konstantin Nikolayevich of Russia). Through Alexandra, Elisabeth was an aunt of Queen Olga of Greece.

Marriage
On 10 February 1852, Elisabeth married her second cousin Peter, Hereditary Grand Duke of Oldenburg. He would succeed his father the following year as Grand Duke, making Elisabeth Grand Duchess of Oldenburg. She used funds given to her by her father on the occasion of her marriage to set up the Elisabeth Foundation, which still exists today. This fund established the Elisabeth Children’s Hospital, which she oversaw, and throughout her life she was a patron of numerous charities and organizations focused on the well-being of children, sometimes supplemented by her foundation.

They had two children:

Elisabeth died on 2 February 1896. Her husband died four years later.

Ancestry

References

|-

Elisabeth
Elisabeth
German duchesses
Grand Duchesses of Oldenburg
Elisabeth
1826 births
1896 deaths
Burials at the Ducal Mausoleum, Gertrudenfriedhof (Oldenburg)
Daughters of monarchs